Lands of Lore: Guardians of Destiny is a 1997 action role-playing game, second installment of the Lands of Lore series, a sequel to Lands of Lore: The Throne of Chaos. It brought about a drastic change in gameplay style from its predecessor, opting away from the original's D&D turn-based style in favor of more action elements. A sequel, Lands of Lore III, was released in 1999.

Gameplay
Similar to its contemporary Realms of the Haunting, Guardians of Destiny is a first-person adventure game which, while featuring occasional combat, revolves around the solving of puzzles. Like in most adventure games, the player can interact with objects and people by clicking on them, collect items into an inventory, and use items from their inventory on environmental objects. However, some puzzles also require the player to cast spells, use their melee attack, or drag objects and even enemy corpses into specific locations.

Navigating through the environment also often involves platforming challenges, some of which can be undertaken only in one specific form. The player character, Luther, has a curse which causes him to randomly change between three forms: human, lizard, and beast. Later in the game the player acquires spells which can be used to change form at will if in human or lizard form; once in beast form Luther must wait to change randomly back to human form, since the beast cannot cast spells. The lizard form is small, allowing it to enter tunnels inaccessible to other forms, but preventing it from crossing even shallow streams of water without drowning. It can run faster and cast spells more easily than other forms. The beast form is tall and heavy, such that it can make only mild jumps, but in some places its size allows it to step across gaps that the other two forms would have to jump over. The human form is an average of the other two in most respects, but is the only form which can equip weapons or armor.

Combat works similarly to The Throne of Chaos, except that the player's party consists of just one character, and most enemies will not attack the player character unless provoked. Luther can use a melee attack, fire a bow at range, use items, and cast spells at four different levels. Each spell has a fifth level which is only usable if Luther consumes an ancient stone or has acquired the Mantle of the Ancients, which occurs at a set point near the end of the game. Spells draw on a limited pool of magic points, which, like Luther's health, is gradually recovered over time.

Plot
The plot follows Luther, son of Scotia, who is imprisoned by the soldiers of Gladstone and accused for being a member of the Dark Army. Luther is cursed to be morphed into either a monster or a lizard, thanks to which he manages to escape. While the Draracle guides him, Dawn and Bacatta (from the previous game) initially chase, and later aid him. Luther must go on his quest while avoiding his many pursuers.

The player controls Luther on his quest to solve the curse. Randomly he will change forms, gaining the respective advantages (higher strength with the beast, or increased magical ability with the lizard), and the opportunity to enter small spaces and discover secret areas). The power to change forms willingly is eventually bestowed upon the player in the game.

There are a myriad of locations to explore. They include, but are not limited to, the Draracle's Caves, the Draracle's Museum, the Huline Jungle, the Savage Jungle, The Dracoid Cemetery and Ruins, the Claw Mountains, the Huline Temple, the Ruloi Citadel, and the wondrous City of the Ancients.

The player can choose between two branches, good or evil, which then evolve into seven possible endings. Endings include when Luther loses the final battle with Be'lial and the land is overrun with nasties, when "good" Luther triumphs and the Draracle discovers Luther in bed with Dawn, and when "bad" Luther triumphs, shown from behind raining destruction on the land as a powerful god. Other endings include not being quick enough to escape from the Armory in Belials Laboratory, which shows Belial smiting the Huline Village with an energy blast, being killed by the Draracle when Luther kills Belial on the Evil ending branch, and being seduced and killed by Dawn before the fight with Belial if the player acted badly towards her during the game. Going to the entrance of the starting cave a second time, at the beginning of the cave results in being killed by the soldiers stationed there, a different cinematic can play, depending on the form Luther is current in at the time of his death.

Development
Because role-playing titles such as The Elder Scrolls II: Daggerfall had recently attained commercial hit status, Westwood opted to "make Lands of Lore 2 one of its flagship titles for the latter half of 1997", according to Next Generation.

Reception

Critical reviews

The game received above-average reviews. Keith Sullivan of PC Gamer US called it a "very good game", but stated that its engine was dated in comparison to Jedi Knight: Dark Forces II and Quake. He believed that those who look past its graphics and "accept it for what it is" will have "a rollicking good time." Cindy Yans of Computer Games Strategy Plus summarized, "This is a solid title with an excellent storyline, interesting characters and a rich, convincing world to explore, but the FMV fiasco, awkward controls and the now-quite-dated graphics engine, along with a very anticlimactic ending, make for a not-quite-stellar adventure RPG."

A reviewer for Next Generation wrote, "Lands of Lore is a worthy sequel, but it's also something of a mutt — part RPG, part adventure". The writer concluded that, while the game "may have its quirks", it is "an entertaining romp" for those willing to overlook the issues. In PC PowerPlay, David Wildgoose hailed it as "perhaps the most complete game I've played" and praised its mixture of genres. He believed that it was "a new level" of quality for Westwood.

PC Zones Jamie Cunningham called the game "yet another Westwood masterpiece", and believed that it "dispenses with all the point-and-click statistical mumbo jumbo, and puts an end to the myth that RPGs are boring." Andy Backer of Computer Game Entertainment summarized the game as "flawed and frustrating but brilliant." Writing for PC Gamer UK, Andy Butcher concluded that "if you can put up with its patchy nature and uninspiring graphics, Lands Of Lore II: Guardians Of Destiny does have many, many hours of fun to offer. But if you were expecting a classic of the genre, you'll be ever-so-slightly disappointed."

In a negative review, Computer Gaming Worlds Scorpia called the game a "horror" and wrote, "Guardians is not an RPG nor an adventure nor an action game, but a patchwork of all three, and a threadbare one at that. For any RPG-starved gamer, this one is a disappointment beyond words."

Sales
The game claimed #11 in the U.S. on PC Data's computer game sales rankings for October 1997. A writer for CNET Gamecenter noted that the game was part of a trend of role-playing successes that month, alongside Ultima Online and Fallout. He remarked, "If October's list is any indication, RPGs are back." The game was absent from PC Data's top 20 by November. 

On Media Control's computer game sales charts for the German market, the game debuted in second place in the latter half of October. Holding this position in the first half of November, it proceeded to chart in the top 10 through the end of 1997. During 1998, the game remained in the top 20 through the end of February, and placed 40th and 45th in May. At that time, it had maintained an unbroken 28-week streak in the top 50.

Awards
The game was a finalist for the Academy of Interactive Arts & Sciences' 1997 "Role Playing Game of the Year" award, which ultimately went to Dungeon Keeper. It was also nominated for the "Best RPG" award at the CNET Gamecenter Awards for 1997, which went to Diablo; and was a runner-up for Computer Gaming Worlds 1997 "Strategy Game of the Year" award, which ultimately went to Fallout. The game won the award for "RPG" at PC PowerPlays 1997 Game of the Year Awards.

References
Notes

Footnotes

External links

1997 video games
DOS games
Fantasy video games
Games commercially released with DOSBox
Role-playing video games
Video games about reptiles
Video games developed in the United States
Video games scored by Frank Klepacki
Virgin Interactive games
Westwood Studios games
Windows games
Single-player video games